Ranaweera Mudiyanselage Shaminda Eranga (born 23 June 1986), or Shaminda Eranga, is a professional Sri Lankan cricketer. He studied at St. Mary's College in Chilaw.

International career
Shaminda made his One Day International debut for Sri Lanka on 16 August 2011  at the Mahinda Rajapaksa International Stadium, Hambantota against Australia.

He made his test debut on September 16, 2011, and took a wicket with his first ball, becoming the 15th player to do so in the history of test cricket.

His constant back injuries meant that he couldn't make the national team regularly after his Test debut, and his next international game came much later, in August 2012 against India, in which he made his Twenty20 International debut.

Health and suspect bowling action
On 19 June 2016, following Sri Lanka's ODI matches in Ireland, Eranga was admitted to hospital in Dublin to undergo tests on his heart. However, on the same day, he was suspended from bowling in international matches by the International Cricket Council (ICC) due to an illegal action reported during the second Test against England earlier the previous month. He was discharged from hospital the following day. On 18 July 2017, ICC cleared Eranga bowling action, so he can play again in international cricket with his revised bowling action.

Domestic career
During Sri Lanka Premier League tournament, he played for Nagenahira Nagas, where his team became runner-up of SLPL, lost final to Uva Next. He won Player of the series trophy for his bowling performances.

See also
 List of bowlers who have taken a wicket with their first ball in a format of international cricket

References

External links
 
 Shaminda Eranga's profile page on Wisden

1986 births
Living people
Sri Lankan cricketers
Sri Lanka One Day International cricketers
Sri Lanka Test cricketers
Sri Lanka Twenty20 International cricketers
Uva cricketers
Ruhuna cricketers
Chilaw Marians Cricket Club cricketers
Tamil Union Cricket and Athletic Club cricketers
Nagenahira Nagas cricketers
Colombo Commandos cricketers
People from Chilaw